is a former Japanese Nippon Professional Baseball player with the Yomiuri Giants in Japan's Central League.

Career
He was playing in the Missoula Osprey (Advanced Rookie level under Arizona Diamondbacks) before he was drafted by the Giants in 2005.

He was awarded as Central League's Rookie of the Year in 2008, beating his teammate and another award favorite Hayato Sakamoto, by finishing with an 11-2 with 67 appearances, the most wins of all-time in Giants' relief pitchers.

On October 5, 2018, he announced retirement after the season.

International career
He was selected Japan national baseball team at the 2009 World Baseball Classic and 2013 World Baseball Classic.

References

External links

1983 births
Living people
Japanese expatriate baseball players in the United States
Missoula Osprey players
Nippon Professional Baseball pitchers
Nippon Professional Baseball Rookie of the Year Award winners
Baseball people from Yokohama
Yomiuri Giants players
2009 World Baseball Classic players
2013 World Baseball Classic players
Japanese baseball coaches
Nippon Professional Baseball coaches